The Mitsuoka Like (雷駆) is a five-door hatchback electric car produced by the Japanese automaker Mitsuoka Motors between 2010 and 2012. It is based on the Mitsubishi i MiEV. 

It was unveiled in 2010 and was discontinued in 2012. The wheelbase was extended to help accommodate five passengers, unlike the i-MiEV, which only seats four. Its distinctive front styling separates it from other rebadged i-MiEVs, including the Citroen C-Zero and the Peugeot Ion. It was priced at USD 55,000, before a Japanese tax credit, which lowered the priced to USD 14,550. 

Mitsuoka vehicles
Production electric cars
Electric city cars

Cars introduced in 2010